Myosin light chain 3, skeletal muscle isoform is a protein that in humans is encoded by the MYL1 gene.

Myosin is a hexameric ATPase cellular motor protein. It is composed of two heavy chains, two nonphosphorylatable alkali light chains, and two phosphorylatable regulatory light chains. This gene encodes a myosin alkali light chain expressed in fast skeletal muscle. Two transcript variants have been identified for this gene.

References

Further reading

EF-hand-containing proteins